The Publishing House of Minority Nationalities is a publishing house established on January 15, 1953, as a division of the State Ethnic Affairs Commission, and focused on academic publishing. Its headquarters are located in Dongcheng District, Beijing, China. Its current director and editor-in-chief is Yu Binxi.

References

External links
 

Book publishing companies of China
Publishing companies established in 1953
Ethnic groups in China
United front (China)